This is a list of anarcho-punk bands, including anarchist bands labelled as crust punk, D-beat, hardcore and folk punk.

A
Against Me!
Amebix
Anthrax
Anti Cimex
Anti-Flag
Antischism
Antisect
Anti-System
The Apostles
Aus-Rotten

See also 
 List of anarchist musicians

References

Bibliography

Further reading 

 

Anarchism lists
 
Lists of punk bands